Sanjay Singh Gangwar (born 10 April 1974) is an Indian politician and a member of Uttar Pradesh Legislative Assembly from Pilibhit since March 2017 representing Bharatiya Janata Party. He is also a Minister of State in Second Yogi Adityanath ministry.

References 

Living people
1974 births
Bharatiya Janata Party politicians from Uttar Pradesh
People from Pilibhit district
Uttar Pradesh MLAs 2017–2022
Uttar Pradesh MLAs 2022–2027
Yogi ministry